Paul Adrien Baysse (born 18 May 1988) is a French former professional footballer who plays as a defender.

Club career
Born in Talence, Baysse has played for Bordeaux, Sedan, Brest, Saint-Étienne, Nice and Málaga.

On 16 August 2018, Baysse was loaned to Ligue 1 side Caen.

On 5 September 2022, Baysse announced his retirement from football.

International career 
Baysse played at youth level for France from 2008 to 2011.

References

External links
 

1988 births
Living people
People from Talence
Sportspeople from Gironde
Association football defenders
French footballers
FC Girondins de Bordeaux players
CS Sedan Ardennes players
Stade Brestois 29 players
AS Saint-Étienne players
OGC Nice players
Málaga CF players
Stade Malherbe Caen players
Ligue 2 players
Ligue 1 players
La Liga players
French expatriate footballers
French expatriate sportspeople in Spain
Expatriate footballers in Spain
Footballers from Nouvelle-Aquitaine